Damian Marshall is a Canadian country music singer/songwriter from Winnipeg, Manitoba. Marshall has released three albums. After an injury while truck driving in 2009, he began working on a fourth album in Nashville, Tennessee.

Discography

Albums

Singles

Awards and nominations

References

External links
Official Site
Biography at countrymusicnews.ca
Official Myspace

Canadian country singer-songwriters
Canadian male singer-songwriters
Living people
Musicians from Winnipeg
Year of birth missing (living people)